The University of Zagreb is the largest Croatian university and the oldest continuously operating university in the area covering Central Europe south of Vienna and all of Southeastern Europe. The University of Zagreb and the University North are the only public universities operating in Northern and Central Croatia.

The history of the University began on September 23, 1669, when the Holy Roman Emperor Leopold I issued a decree granting the establishment of the Jesuit Academy of the Royal Free City of Zagreb. The decree was accepted at the Council of the Croatian Kingdom on November 3, 1671. The Academy was run by the Jesuits for more than a century until the order was dissolved by Pope Clement XIV in 1773. In 1776, Empress Maria Theresa issued a decree founding the Royal Academy of Science which succeeded the previous Jesuit Academy. Bishop Josip Juraj Strossmayer proposed the founding of a University to the Croatian Parliament in 1861. Emperor Franz Joseph signed the decree on the establishment of the University of Zagreb in 1869. The Act of Founding was passed by the Parliament in 1874, and was ratified by the Emperor on January 5, 1874. On October 19, 1874, the Royal University of Franz Joseph I was officially opened.

The University is composed of 29 faculties, 3 art academies and 1 university center with more than 70,000 students.

History

Academy

The beginnings of the later university date back to 23 September 1669 when Emperor and King Leopold I Habsburg issued a decree granting the establishment of the Jesuit Academy of the Royal Free City of Zagreb. According to that document the study of philosophy in Zagreb acquired a formal and legal status as Neoacademia Zagrabiensis and officially became a public institution of higher education.

The academy was run by the Jesuits for more than a century until the order was dissolved by Pope Clement XIV in 1773. Under a new leadership in 1772 the academy enrolled a total of 200 students.

In 1776 Empress and Queen Maria Theresa issued a decree founding the Royal Academy of Science. It consisted of three studies or faculties of philosophy, theology, and law. The former political-cameral studies became part of the newly established faculty of law, and thus were integrated into the academy. Each of the faculties of the Royal Academy of Sciences had several chairs teaching one or several courses. During the Austro-Turkish War of 1788–1791 and following the Austrian occupation of Belgrade on 8 October 1789 the Royal Academy requested to be granted the university status with the following argumentation:

The academy in Zagreb remained until 1874, despite numerous organizational changes, the focal institution of higher education in Croatia, educating most of the members of the Croatian intelligentsia.

University

Bishop Josip Juraj Strossmayer in 1861 proposed to the Croatian Parliament the founding of a university at Zagreb. During his visit in 1869, the Emperor Franz Joseph signed the decree on the establishment of the University of Zagreb. Five years later, the Parliament passed the Act of Founding, which was ratified by the Emperor on 5 January 1874. On 19 October 1874, a ceremony was held in the name of the founding of the Royal University of Franz Joseph I in Zagreb, making it the third university in the Hungarian realm of the Austro-Hungarian Empire.

In 1874 the University had four faculties:
 Law (Pravno-državoslovni fakultet)
 Theology (Bogoslovni fakultet)
 Philosophy (Mudroslovni fakultet)
 Medicine (Liječnički fakultet)

The Faculty of Medicine was not put into function in 1874; it had to wait until 1917. The Faculty of Philosophy served as the general scientific faculty. Since 1876 it had geology, botany, physics, mathematics, and chemistry; since 1877 zoology; since 1882 pharmacy; since 1883 geography.

In 1860, the Royal Agriculture and Forestry College was founded in Križevci. In 1898, the Academy of Forestry (Šumarska akademija) was founded as part of the Faculty of Philosophy, which encompassed all technical studies. In 1919, this school became the Faculty of Husbandry and Forestry.

In 1919, the School of Technology (Tehnička visoka škola) was founded, which was transformed into a university faculty in 1926. Also in 1919 the School of Veterinary Medicine (Veterinarska visoka škola) was founded; it transformed into a university faculty in 1925.

In the Faculty of Philosophy, major reorganization ensued in the 1920s, as mathematics, pharmacy and other sciences started to split off, first with the creation of separate mathematics and pharmaceutical departments in 1928, when the faculty was renamed into its current name Filozofski fakultet.

In 1926, the university was composed of seven faculties:
 Theology (Bogoslovni fakultet)
 Law (Pravnički fakultet)
 Medicine (Liječnički fakultet)
 Philosophy (Mudroslovni fakultet)
 Philosophy dept. (Filozofski odjel)
 Pharmacy dept. (Farmaceutski odjel)
 Husbandry and Forestry (Gospodarsko-šumarski fakultet)
 Veterinary Medicine (Veterinarski fakultet)
 Technology (Tehnički fakultet)
 Construction dept. (Građevni odsjek)
 Engineering dept. (Strojarski odsjek)
 Chemical engineering dept. (Kemijsko-inženjerski odsjek)

On 26 August 1936 a group of Macedonian students belonging to the MANAPO signed the Political Declaration, an illegal document requesting political and social emancipation of Macedonians in the Kingdom of Yugoslavia.

During the Independent State of Croatia (1941–1945), the university was known as the Croatian University (Hrvatsko sveučilište).

The individual departments of the Faculty of Philosophy became separate faculties in 1942, 1946 when the Faculty of Sciences was formed, and finally in 1963.

In 1956, the Faculty of Technology was divided into four faculties:
 Architecture-Construction-Geodesy (Arhitektonsko-građevinsko-geodetski fakultet)
 Electrical engineering (Elektrotehnički fakultet)
 Mechanical engineering-Shipbuilding (Strojarsko-brodograđevni fakultet)
 Chemistry-Food technology-Mining (Tehnološki fakultet)

These eventually split up into the current layout.

In 1999., the University decided to implement European Credit Transfer System - ECTS. When Croatia signed to be a part of The Bologna declaration, all of the universities in Croatia adopted this system of easily readable and comparable degrees.

University offers  160 undergraduate programmes (ba/bsc), 22 integrated undergraduate-graduate programmes, 9 vocational undergraduate programmes, 174 graduate programmes (ma/msc), 1 vocational graduate programme, 72 doctoral programmes (PhD) and 165 specialist postgraduate programmes.

Faculties
Natural sciences
 Faculty of Science

Engineering
 Faculty of Architecture
 Faculty of Chemical Engineering and Technology
 Faculty of Civil Engineering
 Faculty of Electrical Engineering and Computing
 Faculty of Geodesy
 Faculty of Geotechnics (in Varaždin)
 Faculty of Graphic Arts
 Faculty of Mechanical Engineering and Naval Architecture
 Faculty of Metallurgy (in Sisak)
 Faculty of Mining, Geology and Petroleum Engineering
 Faculty of Textile Technology
 Faculty of Transport and Traffic Sciences

Biomedical sciences
 Faculty of Pharmacy and Biochemistry
 Faculty of Veterinary Medicine
 School of Dental Medicine
 School of Medicine

Biotechnology
 Faculty of Agriculture
 Faculty of Food Technology and Biotechnology
 Faculty of Forestry

Social sciences
 Faculty of Economics and Business
 Faculty of Kinesiology
 Faculty of Law
 Faculty of Organization and Informatics in Varaždin
 Faculty of Political Science
 Faculty of Special Education and Rehabilitation
 Faculty of Teacher Education

Humanities
 Catholic Faculty of Theology
 Faculty of Humanities and Social Sciences
 Faculty of Croatian Studies
 Faculty of Philosophy and Religious Sciences

The arts
 Academy of Dramatic Art
 Academy of Fine Arts
 Academy of Music

Philosophy and Religious Sciences

Faculty of Philosophy and Religious Sciences (FFRZ) is a part of the University of Zagreb, Croatia  It remains a work of the Society of Jesus and traces its origins to 1662.

FFRZ in Zagreb began as a Jesuit school of philosophy on 6 November 1662 with the establishment of the Philosophy Department at Zagreb College, which would become the University of Zagreb.

The Faculty of Philosophy of the Society of Jesus (FFDI) closed in 1773 due to the suppression of the Society of Jesus, and the Jesuit philosophy school in Zagreb did not reopen until 1937, when it offered a three-year course leading to the licentiate in philosophy, as it does today.

On 31 July 1989 the Congregation for Catholic Education of the Holy See decreed that the Faculty of Philosophy could confer the baccalaureate, licentiate, and doctorate in philosophy.

With a decision of 7 October 1992, the Ministry of Science and Technology entered FFDI into the register as a Scientific Research Organization in philosophy and it became a part of the Croatian Studies Department of the University of Zagreb.

On 8 December 2016, the Senate of the University of Zagreb determined that FFDI would become a faculty and equal component of the University under the title Faculty of Philosophy and Religious Sciences (FFRZ).

Undergraduates may major in Philosophy and Religious Sciences, Philosophy, or Philosophy and Latin Language. Graduate students may major in Philosophy or Religious Science. FFRZ also offers post-graduate studies.

FFRZ has a formal relationship with Laudato TV to "work together to promote and implement educational, cultural and scientific activities in the Christian and humanistic atmosphere".

In 2017 there were two current research studies at the Faculty of Philosophy and Religious Sciences:
 Practical ethics and commitment to the common good in times of crisis. Is there a place for virtue in Croatian society?
 Christian philosophy within the Croatian philosophy of the 20th century.
On 5 May 2017 a symposium was held on "Religions and Migration: Displaced Persons and Refugees".

The faculty is led by a chancellor and his deputy along with a dean and vice-dean. The chancellor is Arturo Sosa, General Superior of the Society of Jesus based in Rome. His deputy is Dalibor Renić, Provincial Superior of the Croatian Province of the Society of Jesus based in Zagreb. The dean is Prof. Ivan Koprek, The Faculty Council is composed of all regular and extraordinary professors and the Faculty Conference includes all current lecturers, student representatives, and faculty officials.

Rectors

* Ivančić was elected rector in 2001, but resigned due to health reasons before his term started.
Source: List of rectors at the University of Zagreb website

Rankings 

As of 2020, the university ranked 801-1000 by QS, ranking 575 by USN, ranking 512 by CWUR, ranked 401-500 by ARWU, and 1001+ by THE.

Legacy

Since 1874, more than 200,000 students have received a bachelor's degree, more than 18,000 a master's, and more than 8,000 a doctorate from the University of Zagreb.

Gallery

See also 

 Balkan Universities Network
 List of modern universities in Europe (1801–1945)
 List of universities in Croatia
 National and University Library Zagreb

References

Further reading

External links
 Official website

 
17th-century establishments in Croatia
1669 establishments in the Habsburg monarchy
Zagreb, University of
Forestry in Croatia